Chou Szu-chi (born 26 October 1981 in Hualien County, Taiwan) is a Taiwanese professional baseball outfielders for the CTBC Brothers of Chinese Professional Baseball League (CPBL). At the end of 2008, when the dmedia T-REX folded in a gambling scandal, he was picked by the Brother Elephants in the third round of the redistribution draft.

His performance in the 2012 season earned him the 2012 CPBL MVP of the Year award. He was part of Chinese Taipei's 2013 World Baseball Classic roster. He batted .429/.692/.571 in the qualification and .200/.333/267 during the competition. During the second round match between Chinese Taipei and Japan, his base on ball in the 3rd inning helped Chinese Taipei score their first run. This, along with his combined 9 base on balls (during the qualification and the competition), earned him the nickname of "Asia's King of Plate discipline" (亞洲選球王).

Career statistics

References

External links
 

1981 births
Living people
Baseball outfielders
Brother Elephants players
CTBC Brothers players
Macoto Cobras players
People from Hualien County
Taiwanese baseball players
2013 World Baseball Classic players
Dmedia T-REX players